Hot, Cool, & Vicious is the debut studio album by American hip hop trio Salt-N-Pepa. Released by Next Plateau Records on December 8, 1986, it was the first rap album by a female rap act to attain gold and platinum status in the US. 

Hot, Cool, & Vicious reached the top 40 on the US Billboard 200 chart. The album included the single "Push It", which reached the top 20 on the US Billboard Hot 100 chart and number two on the UK Singles Chart after being propelled by a remix, and was nominated for Best Rap Performance at the 31st Annual Grammy Awards. The album has sold approximately four million copies worldwide. It became the first album by a female rap act to attain gold and platinum status by the Recording Industry Association of America (RIAA).

Release
The album features the songs "The Showstopper" and "I'll Take Your Man", recorded and released prior to the full album's release. It also includes R&B radio favorites "Tramp" and "My Mic Sound Nice". In 1987, the addition of the single "Push It" (US #19, UK #2), along with the replacement of two other tracks with remixed versions, propelled the album to gold, then platinum status in the United States, and made it the first album by a female rap act (or group) to attain gold and platinum certifications from the Recording Industry Association of America. "Push It" was also certified platinum.

Reception

NME placed Hot, Cool & Vicious at number 18 on their list of the best releases of 1987. The album was certified platinum in the US, making the trio the first female rap act to have a gold or platinum album.

Track listing

Notes
 "Push It (Remix)" was not part of the original track listing of the 1986 release of Hot, Cool & Vicious, which also included the original unedited and unremixed versions of "Tramp" and "Chick on the Side". The original version of "Push It" was recorded in 1987 and added to later pressings of the album.

Charts

Weekly charts

Year-end charts

Certifications

References

1986 debut albums
Albums produced by Hurby Azor
Albums recorded at Greene St. Recording
Next Plateau Entertainment albums
Salt-N-Pepa albums